A phalera was a sculpted disk, usually made of gold, silver, bronze or glass, and worn on the breastplate during parades by Roman soldiers who had been awarded it as a kind of medal. Roman military units could also be awarded phalerae for distinguished conduct in action. These awards were often mounted on the staffs of the unit's standards. The term also refers to disks crafted by the continental Celts for religious and ornamental purposes, especially those used on equestrian gear.

See also 
 Roman military decorations and punishments
 Mirror armour – similar oriental armour

References

External links 
 Roman Military Equipment – Military Awards and Decorations

Military awards and decorations of ancient Rome